Gabbiadini is an Italian surname. Notable people with the surname include:

Manolo Gabbiadini (born 1991), Italian footballer
Marco Gabbiadini (born 1968), English footballer
Melania Gabbiadini (born 1983), Italian women's footballer
Riccardo Gabbiadini (born 1970), Welsh footballer

Italian-language surnames